Abraham Hulk Senior (1 May 1813 in London – 23 March 1897 in Zevenaar) was an Anglo-Dutch painter, draughtsman  and  lithographer. He initially trained as a portraitist, but became a well-known as a marine-painter and the patriarch of a whole family of Anglo-Dutch artists.

Biography
Hulk was born in London, the son of the merchant Hendrik Hulk and Mary Burroughs.  He trained as a portrait painter under Jean Augustin Daiwaille (1786–1850) before continuing his artistic education at the Rijksacademie in Amsterdam.

During 1833 and 1834 he travelled to America, visiting New York and Boston, and exhibiting in the latter city. In 1834 he returned to Amsterdam, where he lived until 1855, when he relocated to Nijkerk, later moving to Enkhuizen, then to Haarlem, back to Amsterdam, then to Oosterbeek, before returning to Amsterdam once more. In 1870 he settled in England, where he spent the rest of his life. He became well-known because he seemed to have the ability to paint the sea and its ships in such a different way for which he became one of the great marine painters. Some of his portraits have survived. His work was exhibited in the Royal Academy in London from 1876 to 1890 where he entered three paintings of which two were Dutch seascapes. He also exhibited at the Suffolk Street Galleries in London and in Leeuwarden and The Hague in the Netherlands from 1843 to 1868.

Family
Other painters  in his family included his younger brother Johannes Frederik Hulk Senior (1829–1911),  his sons  Hendrik Hulk (1842-1937),  Abraham Hulk Junior (1843–1919) and Willem Frederik Hulk (b.1852) and his nephew Johannes Frederik Hulk (1855–1913).  Abraham Hulk Senior married Maria Wilhelmina van der Meulen; as well as the sons named above they had two daughters, Maria Cornelia Hulk (born 1838) and Hendrika Geertruida Petronella Hulk (born 1841).

Abraham Senior was the teacher of his brother Johannes Frederik and several other members of his family, and also of the painter Adrianus David Hilleveld.

Death
Although most literature states that he died in London, he actually died on a short visit in Zevenaar in the Netherlands.

Museums
His works hang in the Amsterdam, Dordrecht, Haarlem and Enschede museums.

References

Sources
Pieter A. Scheen, Lexicon Nederlandse Beeldende Kunstenaars
P.T.A.Swillens, Prisma Schilderslexicon
Christopher Wood, The Dictionary of Victorian Painters
 Boomstra, Ankie De schilders Hulk. Een kunstenaarsfamilie in de 19e eeuw, Utrecht, 1994
 Rijksbureau voor Kunsthistorische Documentatie: Hulk, Abraham
 Allgemeines Künstlerlexikon: Hulk, Abraham (1813)
 Genealogie Hulk on Geneanet by Elaine Paterson

External links

Burlington paintings
Simonis-Buunk

Death announcement in the "Nieuws van den dag"
Schilderijen De Wiek

Dutch marine artists
1897 deaths
Painters from London
Dutch painters
Dutch male painters
19th-century English painters
English male painters
1813 births
19th-century English male artists